Iwao Horiuchi (堀内 岩雄, 9 December 1941 – 4 March 2015) was a Japanese lightweight freestyle wrestler. He competed at the 1964 and 1968 Olympics and won a bronze medal in 1964. He also won a world title in 1963 and finished second in 1966. He died of diabetes in March 2015, aged 63.

References

External links
 

1941 births
2015 deaths
Olympic wrestlers of Japan
Wrestlers at the 1964 Summer Olympics
Wrestlers at the 1968 Summer Olympics
Japanese male sport wrestlers
Olympic bronze medalists for Japan
Olympic medalists in wrestling
World Wrestling Championships medalists
Medalists at the 1964 Summer Olympics
20th-century Japanese people
21st-century Japanese people